Borislav Stojkov (born October 17, 1941 in Serbia) is an engineer of architecture and professor at University of Belgrade, Faculty of Geography. He is a full member of the Academy of Engineering Sciences of Serbia.

Biography and career
After graduating architecture at the University of Belgrade Faculty of Architecture (1964) he completed his master studies at the same faculty (1974) and achieved his doctoral degree at the University of Sarajevo (1990). Later he specialized regional planning at MIT-SPURS (United States, 1970/71), London (1974) and Gothenburg (Sweden, 1975). In his professional career he was mostly engaged in town planning from 1966 to 1990, and spatial planning from 1991 to 2015. His scientific engagement was mostly from 1991 till today (2017). He was active in big strategic projects in Serbia and Europe. His educational career at the Belgrade University – Faculty of Geography]] took place between 1993 till 2009 when he was retired. He also taught at universities of Trieste, Wien and Dresden. He represented Serbia in management and steering committees of INTERREG IIIc program in Wien. He was president of the Association of Architects of Belgrade, president of the Union of Town Planners of Serbia and the member of presidential board of Yugoslav Architects Association. He was engaged in number of juries in Serbia, Croatia and Bosnia and Herzegovina, and also as a member of 5-member jury for UIA Gold Medal in Architecture 1989. He was one of the three spokesmen for the network of scientific institutions in spatial planning of Central and East/South East Europe, Spa-ce.net (with Prof. Mueller and Prof. Božidar Finka), and coordinator of scientific sector of Academia Danubiana at the Bodenkultur University in Vienna. He is the full member of the Academy of Engineering Sciences of Serbia]], and member of associations of architects, town planners and spatial planning of Serbia.

Scientific and professional works
The largest number of over 150 scientific works in the fields of town and spatial (regional) planning and development prepared by Borislav Stojkov has been published from 1974 to 2017. Out of those published in Serbia the most significant have been prepared in the Institute of Architecture and Town Planning of Serbia, the University of Belgrade – Faculty of Geography, the University of Novi Sad-Faculty of Civil Engineering, and in Europe those published at Aristotle University in Thessaloniki, the journal EUREG in Hanover, Euromontana in Zurich, Information zu Raumentwicklung in BDR Bonn, SPECTRA centre in Bratislava, Institute für den Donauraum und Mitteleuropa in Vienna, Österreichisches Ost – und Südosteuropa – Institute in Vienna, Bodenkultur University in Vienna, European Council of Spatial Planners in Brussels, Springer in Berlin, Polish Academy of Sciences-Institute of Geography, Academy od Science and Arts in Sarajevo, etc. Out of 32 published books where he was either author or editor/author the most important are: The Town Plannig in Europe (in Serbian, 1995), The Renewal of Serbian Towns (in Serbian, 1996), The Urban Renewal of Prizren (in Serbian, 1997), three books on the matter of urban renewal in Serbia and Russia in cooperation with Russian Academy of Architecture (in Serbian, 1997/98), The City of Belgrade and its Region (in Serbian, 2003), Metropolitan Networking in CADSES (2006), Urban Challenges of Belgrade (in Serbian, 2011), Spatial Planning in Serbia (in Serbian, 2012), European Cities in Transition 2013 – the part on Southern Sub-region (UN Habitat, 2012), and Smart City in Serbia (in Serbian, 2016). He was in charge of coordinating and preparing more than 120 professional works in architecture (public garage Masarikova in Belgrade-author), Master and regulatory urban plans in Serbia and Bosnia and Herzegovina, national spatial plans of Serbia and Republic Srpska, regional spatial plans (City of Belgrade and AP Vojvodina – methodology and scientific leadership) and several local spatial plans. He was engaged as team leader of spatial development strategies of Serbia and some Serbian cities, and also as a member of European teams for preparing spatial development strategies of big regions in Central, Eastern and South-East Europe (VISION Planet, ESTIA, PlaNet CenSE). More than 140 articles of him, with professional or cultural issues elaborated,  have been published in public and professional journals in Serbia. He had three exhibitions of his works in Belgrade and Sarajevo, and participated at several other exhibitions in Serbia and Europe.

Besides, Borislav Stojkov is engaged in music as auto-didact, plays piano and writes about music. The most important is his book on film music prepared with famous musicologist Donata Premeru as his interlocutor.

Cooperation
During his career Borislav Stojkov was engaged in a large number of leading positions in institutions, public enterprises, planning bureaus and associations cooperating with many colleagues in Serbia and abroad. As director he worked in the Town Planning Office of Belgrade, Invest-Bureau, Agency for Accommodating Refugees in Serbia, Republic Agency for Spatial Planning of Serbia and Institute of Architecture and Town Planning of Serbia (director of planning sector). Among institutions where he had the leading position were Association of Architects of Belgrade, Union of Town Planners of Serbia, Presidential Board of Yugoslav Architects Union, Ministry of Town Planning in Serbian Government (Assistant minister), Institute for Spatial Planning at the Faculty of Geography in Belgrade etc. Ha was also editor-in-chief of professional journals Arhitektura  urbanizam and Territorium, and president of the Council for Civil Engineering and Town Planning Sciences at University of Belgrade.

Influence
In his work Borislav Stojkov was engaged in developing and advancing town planning and spatial planning theory and practice. After his specialization in the United States and Europe he brought new ideas into the practice of Serbia over published books, articles and plans of him. His planning experience he also used for his activities in Europe. He was ready to adopt and adapt to Serbian circumstances ideas such as organic growth and development of cities and regions, sustainable territorial development, urban cultural identity, active public participation in planning, concept of smart city, etc. From 2010 he has continually criticized neoliberal concept in planning and urban development in Serbia.

Awards and recognitions
Borislav Stojkov has achieved numerous awards and recognitions in Serbia and Europe. He has 9 awards in architectural and urbanistic competitions in Serbia and Poland. In Serbian Urbanistic Salon he achieved Grand Prix and 6 top prizes and other awards and recognitions. During his career he has received many recognitions and other honorary mentions of professional and social importance such as October Award of Obrenovac, Award of Ministry of Culture in Poland and others.

Books and projects
 https://books.google.rs/books?id=n0EUAAAACAAJ&dq=stojkov+borislav&hl=en&sa=X&ved=0ahUKEwjrlpjg8djWAhVDIVAKHYALA5YQ6AEIRjAH
 https://books.google.rs/books?id=DoZjAAAACAAJ&dq=borislav+stojkov&hl=en&sa=X&ved=0ahUKEwjX8NWg8tjWAhVSPFAKHa7iAj4Q6AEIKTAB
 https://books.google.rs/books?id=kOqLAAAACAAJ&dq=stojkov+borislav&hl=en&sa=X&ved=0ahUKEwjrlpjg8djWAhVDIVAKHYALA5YQ6AEIUTAJ
 https://web.archive.org/web/20170216133058/http://unhabitat.org/books/the-state-of-european-cities-in-transition-2013-english-version/
 http://www.siemens.rs/portal/onama/125-godina/urbani-izazovi/Urbani%20izazovi%20grada%20Beograda.pdf?ver=02
 https://web.archive.org/web/20171030200548/http://www.rapp.gov.rs/sr-Latn-CS/content/cid310/prostorni-plan-republike-srbije
 http://www.vladars.net/sr-SP-Cyrl/Vlada/Ministarstva/mgr/Documents/21.5.%D0%9A%D0%BE%D1%80%D0%B8%D1%88%D1%9B%D0%B5%D1%9A%D0%B5%20%D0%B7%D0%B5%D0%BC%D1%99%D0%B8%D1%88%D1%82%D0%B0%20%D0%B8%20%D1%84%D1%83%D0%BD%D0%BA%D1%86%D0%B8%D0%BE%D0%BD%D0%B0%D0%BB%D0%BD%D0%B0%20%D0%B8%D0%B4%D0%B5%D0%BD%D1%82%D0%B8%D1%84%D0%B8%D0%BA%D0%B0%D1%86%D0%B8%D1%98%D0%B0%20%D0%A0%D0%B5%D0%BF%D1%83%D0%B1%D0%BB%D0%B8%D0%BA%D0%B5%20%D0%A1%D1%80%D0%BF%D1%81%D0%BA%D0%B5_059430109.pdf
 https://web.archive.org/web/20171107010745/http://195.222.96.93//rapp_mape/123/RPPAPB.pdf
 http://www.doiserbia.nb.rs/img/doi/0350-3593/2007/0350-35930702175S.pdf
 https://books.google.rs/books?id=xFyTAAAACAAJ&dq=borislav+stojkov&hl=en&sa=X&ved=0ahUKEwj8p6S28tjWAhXPa1AKHXhEDsk4ChDoAQg-MAY

External links
 
  http://balkans.aljazeera.net/tag/borislav-stojkov
  http://www.gaf.ni.ac.rs/_news/_info/conf11/Predavanje%20Borislav%20Stojkov.pdf
  http://www.capital.ba/prijedlog-prostornog-plana-ima-stratesko-razvojni-karakter/
  http://www.gradsubotica.co.rs/urbani-identitet-prof-dr-borislav-stojkov/
  http://www.koreni.rs/izdisaj-beograda-na-vodi/
  http://www.danas.rs/danasrs/dijalog/izdisaj_beograda_na_vodi.46.html?news_id=296298
  http://www.rts.rs/page/radio/sr/story/1451/stereorama/1076278/muzika-s-povodom.html
  http://www.danas.rs/kultura.11.html?news_id=333447&title=Izme%C4%91u+emocije+i+vizuelizacije
  http://www.rts.rs/page/radio/ci/story/1441/%D0%A1%D1%82%D0%B5%D1%80%D0%B5%D0%BE%D1%80%D0%B0%D0%BC%D0%B0/1038480/%D0%9C%D1%83%D0%B7%D0%B8%D0%BA%D0%B0+%D1%81+%D0%BF%D0%BE%D0%B2%D0%BE%D0%B4%D0%BE%D0%BC.html

1941 births
Living people
Architects from Belgrade
Academic staff of the University of Belgrade
University of Belgrade Faculty of Architecture alumni